Rotala ramosior is a species of flowering plant in the loosestrife family known by the common name lowland rotala. This aquatic or semiaquatic plant is native to North America, where it grows in lakes, streams, and irrigation ditches. The branching stems of the plant grow to about 40 cm long. Leaves are decussate, arranged oppositely in perpendicular pairs along the stems. The leaves are linear to lance-shaped to oval and up to 5 cm long. Flowers occur singly in leaf axils. Each has triangular sepals with long, narrow appendages and usually four tiny white petals in shades of pink to white.  This plant is sometimes grown in aquariums.

References

External links
 Jepson Manual Treatment
 Photo gallery

ramosior
Flora of North America
Plants described in 1753
Taxa named by Carl Linnaeus
Freshwater plants